Roy Ramsay (born 3 January 1956) is a former Australian rules footballer who played with North Melbourne and Essendon in the Victorian Football League (VFL).

Ramsay, a back pocket, was originally from Broadmeadows. His first stint at North Melbourne was from 1976 to 1981, during which time he never managed to play more than nine games in a season. He did play in four finals, including North Melbourne's 1979 preliminary final loss to Collingwood, but didn't feature in any of their three grand final appearances.

In 1982, Ramsay played for Essendon, but was restricted mainly to the reserves, where he won a best and fairest award.

Ramsay returned to North Melbourne in 1983 and became a regular fixture in the team, playing 23 games that year, 21 in 1984 and 19 in 1985. He played seven games in the 1986 VFL season, then didn't make any appearances the following year, troubled by a shoulder injury. In 1988 he left the club for Port Melbourne.

He is a cousin of Billy Swan, a former VFA footballer who is the father of Brownlow Medalist Dane Swan.

References

1956 births
Australian rules footballers from Victoria (Australia)
North Melbourne Football Club players
Essendon Football Club players
Port Melbourne Football Club players
Living people